Lionedya mongolica is a species of beetle in the family Carabidae, the only species in the genus Lionedya.

References

Lebiinae